Jarno Saarinen
  Cecil Sandford
  David Salom
  Charlie Salt
  Federico Sandi
  Christian Sarron
  Kevin Schwantz
  Taro Sekiguchi
  Barry Sheene
  Iván Silva
  Dave Simmonds
  Julián Simón
  Marco Simoncelli
  Barry Smith
  Bradley Smith
  Jakub Smrž
  Freddie Spencer
  Svend Aage Sørensen
  Emilio Soprani
  František Šťastný
  Julian Stevens
  Casey Stoner
  Andrew Stroud
  John Surtees

 S